Sevilla la Nueva is a town located in the south west of the Community of Madrid, Spain. It had a population of 8,578 in 2007.

Notable people

References

External links
 The official site of the city 

Municipalities in the Community of Madrid